Wayland is an unincorporated community in western Paris Township, Portage County, Ohio, United States.  It is located at latitude 41.161 and longitude -81.071, with an elevation of 948 feet.  It has a post office with the ZIP code 44285. The community is part of the Akron Metropolitan Statistical Area.

For a period of time in the nineteenth century, when it was a stop on the Pennsylvania and Ohio Canal, Wayland was called "Cyclone."  However, the name was changed, as it reminded people of a tornado.   The community is nicknamed Cyclone, Newport and Parisville.

Draft beer.

References

Unincorporated communities in Portage County, Ohio
Unincorporated communities in Ohio